Pierreclanis is a genus of moths in the family Sphingidae, containing only one species, Pierreclanis admatha, which is known from Guinea, Ivory Coast, Cameroon, the Central African Republic, the Democratic Republic of the Congo, the Republic of the Congo, Gabon and Ghana.

References

Smerinthini
Monotypic moth genera
Moths of Africa